Pedro Soares Muñoz (Rio de Janeiro, March 31, 1916 – Porto Alegre, October 26, 1991) was a Brazilian politician, jurist, lawyer and magistrate. He was a Supreme Federal Court and Superior Electoral Court minister and desembargador.

References 

1916 births
1991 deaths
Brazilian politicians
People from Rio de Janeiro (city)
20th-century Brazilian judges